Christine Cook (born 22 June 1970 in Preston, Lancashire) is a retired field hockey defender from England. She represented Hightown on club level, and competed for Great Britain at the 1996 Summer Olympics, finishing in fourth place.

References

External links
 

1970 births
Living people
English female field hockey players
Olympic field hockey players of Great Britain
British female field hockey players
Field hockey players at the 1996 Summer Olympics
Sportspeople from Preston, Lancashire